Georgios Plitsis (born 10 August 1963) is a former football goalkeeper. He played for AEL, Olympiacos and Iraklis.

International career
Plitsis appeared in 20 matches for the senior Greece national football team from 1982 to 1991.

Honours
AEL
 Alpha Ethniki: 1987–88
 Greek Cup: 1985

References

1963 births
Living people
Greek footballers
Olympiacos F.C. players
Iraklis Thessaloniki F.C. players
Athlitiki Enosi Larissa F.C. players
Greece international footballers
Association football goalkeepers

Footballers from Larissa